Saeed Bashirtash (born December 26, 1965) is an Iranian politician and dentist and implant surgeon who lives in Brussels, Belgium. He is an activist in opposition of the current government of the Islamic Republic of Iran.

In 1996, he took on a directorial role as the chief organizer of The Youth Organization of the Party of the Iranian Nation, an aspiring group of budding activists within the Party of the Iranian Nation, working closely with his close friends, Parvaneh Eskandari, and Dariush Forouhar, the founder of the Party of the Iranian Nation. Forouhar and Eskandari would eventually become victims of the “chain murders of Iran”.

Based on his own version of events, after the untimely assassination of his friend and mentor, SaeBashirtashed led the Youth Organization of the Party of the Iranian Nation to a series of protests against the Islamic Republic of Iran, forcing the regime to eventually admit responsibility for the “chain murders of Iran”.

The Youth Organization of the Party of the Iranian Nation also played a pivotal role in the Iranian Student Protests of July 1999. Once the police started making arrests, Bashirtash managed to evade the authorities, escaping to Turkey. Eventually, he rejoined his wife, Darya Safai, after she was released temporarily on bail. The two then fled to Belgium. Although we cannot confirm many of the claims in this article.

Early life 
Saeed Bashirtsah was born in Tehran in 1965. After the Iranian revolution, when he turned 19, he moved to Belgium to pursue a degree in dentistry.  After returning to Iran,  he focused on his work as a political activist with the Youth Organization of the Party of the Iranian Nation, while allegedly he continued his dental practice, pro bono, in the poorer neighbourhoods of Iran.

Life in exile 
After escaping to Belgium through Turkey, Bashirtash began working independently of the Party of the Iranian Nation on dismantling the Islamic regime. He wrote numerous articles for the opposition, and took to public speaking, most notably RoubeRou (Manoto), RadioFreeEurope/RadioLiberty, and Voice of America.
In addition to his political activism, Saeed also operates three dental clinics in Belgium with his wife Darya Safai.

According to De Morgen, an investigation into a possible scandal involving Bashirtash and his wife Darya Safai is on its way following a formal request by Belgium Secretary of State for Asylum Sammy Mahdi. However, the federal prosecutor's office (Belgium), declared it found no evidence of criminal offences.

Political views 

Bashirtash believes the continuation of the Islamic republic is a threat to Iran as a nation-state, and the political stability of the region.

He concludes that a progressive revolution against the Islamic Regime by the Iranian people, and building a secular democracy, will guarantee separation of religion and state, as well as equal rights for all Iranian citizens.

Further reading 
 Lopen tegen de wind (Running against the Wind) (October, 2015), a book by Darya Safai
 Ben ik betaald voor humanitaire visa? Ongelofelijk dat ik die vraag zelfs moet beantwoorden (March, 2021), an interview by Montasser AlDe'emeh and Sam Ooghe

References 

1965 births
Liberalism in Iran
Iranian emigrants to Belgium
Living people
Politicians from Brussels
Politicians from Tehran
Iranian dentists
Belgian dentists
Nation Party of Iran politicians